A magazine is a kind of periodical publication.

Magazine may also refer to:

Storage
Magazine (artillery), a place to store ammunition in warships and fortifications
Gunpowder magazine, buildings formerly used for storing gunpowder in wooden barrels
Magazine (firearms), a device that holds ammunition for firearms
Camera magazine, a light-tight chamber to feed and take up film in a camera

Music
Magazine (band), an English musical group fronted by ex-Buzzcocks member Howard Devoto in the late 1970s
Magazine (Heart album), 1977, or the title track
Magazine (Meisa Kuroki album), 2011
The Magazine (album), 1984 by Rickie Lee Jones
Magazine (Jump, Little Children album), 1998
Magazine EP, by Ailee
"Magazines" (song), a 2008 song by The Automatic
"Magazine", a song from the 2002 album Control by Pedro the Lion

Media
Magazine (TV channel), an Argentine TV channel
The Magazine, a Canadian entertainment magazine
Magazine (Lebanese magazine), Lebanese weekly official known as L'Hebdo Magazine

Places 
England
Magazine Gateway, an entrance to Leicester Castle
United States
Magazine, Arkansas, a town in the United States
Mount Magazine, the tallest mountain in Arkansas
Magazine Street, a location in New Orleans